Frederick Matthew Thomas Ponsonby, 4th Baron Ponsonby of Shulbrede, Baron Ponsonby of Roehampton (born 27 October 1958), is a British peer and Labour politician.

Life

Frederick Ponsonby was the eldest child of Thomas Ponsonby, 3rd Baron Ponsonby of Shulbrede (1930–1990), and his first wife Ursula Fox-Pitt. He succeeded his father as Baron Ponsonby in 1990. He sits for Labour and is a regular contributor in debates. He lost his seat in the House of Lords after the passing of the House of Lords Act 1999. However, in 2000 he was created a life peer as Baron Ponsonby of Roehampton, of Shulbrede in the County of West Sussex, and was able to return to the upper chamber of parliament.

He is a member of the Joint Committee on the Draft Domestic Abuse Bill.

Ponsonby is married and has two children, Eve (born 1991) and Cameron (1995).

References

Sources 
 Mr Frederick Ponsonby (Hansard)
 Frederick Matthew Thomas Ponsonby, 4th Baron Ponsonby de Shulbrede, * 1958 | Geneall.net
 Conqueror 86
 https://web.archive.org/web/20091003025807/http://www.dodonline.co.uk/engine.asp?lev1=4&lev2=38&menu=81&biog=y&id=26499
 The Discovery Service

1958 births
Living people
Barons in the Peerage of the United Kingdom
Labour Party (UK) life peers
Labour Party (UK) hereditary peers
Frederick Ponsonby, 4th Baron Ponsonby of Shulbrede
Ponsonby
Life peers created by Elizabeth II
Ponsonby of Shulbrede